Santa Maria del Rio is one of the 58 municipalities that make up the Mexican state of San Luis Potosí. The municipality is located in the southern part of the state, approximately 48 kilometers east of the city of San Luis Potosí. Santa Maria del Rio has a land area of 1,655 square kilometers, with 37,290 inhabitants. , 12,000 were living in the town of Santa Maria del Rio. The area is famous for its rebozos, being the cradle of the blue and white rebozo de bolita. The Rebozo Caramelo is woven there.

Geography 
Santa Maria del Rio is located in the center of the southern part of the San Luis Potosí, at an average altitude of 1,710 meters above sea level. The municipality is bordered on the north by the municipalities of Zaragoza, San Nicolás Tolentino and Ciudad Fernández, to the east is San Luis Potosí, to the south is Tierra Nueva and to the west is Villa de Reyes.

Santa Maria del Rio lies on the Mexican Mesa del Centro on the western edge of the Sierra Madre Oriental and consequently has a mountainous terrain, with various hills: the Membrillo, the Rincón Pilitas, the Duraznillo, San Pablo, the Platanito, San Antonio, the Banqueta, the Pachona, the Joya, the Mesa Prieta, the Barbechos, as well as the Sierra de Bagres.  The area rests on Mesozoic rocks. The land is mainly used for livestock, forestry and agriculture, in that order.

The rocks in Santa Maria del Rio are mineral rich, and several mines have operated there.  The locale is noted for its cinnabar, an ore of mercury.

Santa Maria del Rio lies in the Tamuin River basin, a tributary of the Panuco River. Its major drainage is the Santa Maria River. The thermal springs in the hills at Blameario de Lourdes provide the state with its sparkling mineral water, Agua de Lourdes.

Because of its elevation, Santa Maria del Rio has a dry, temperate climate, cooler in the highlands and warmer in the lowlands. Almost all of the rain falls between May and September, the total annual average rainfall for those months is 362 mm (14¼ in.).  It never freezes, the record low was 4.5 °C in January and the record high was 37 °C in May, with an average annual temperature of 18.5 °C.

History 
The area where the municipality of Santa Maria del Rio now is, was a contact zone between various Mesoamerican cultures. Archaeological evidence shows that the region was once occupied by people of advanced culture, sedentary farmers who built permanent structures.  However, sometime prior to the arrival of the Spanish conquistadors nomads invaded the area and there were no existing settlements when the Spanish came. However, after the fall of Tenochtitlan, the Otomi began to move north as allies of the Spanish. Otherwise, the semi-nomadic Guachichil were the local inhabitants at the time of the founding of the municipality.

The date of the founding of the town has been controversial.  It is often listed as 1589, citing noted historian Primo Feliciano Velázquez's  pamphlet Descubrimiento y Conquista de San Luis Potosí  (Discovery and Conquest of San Luis Potosí); however, there is a Franciscan baptismal document dated 15 August 1542 for some Guachichil indicating that the settlement was already in place,  and that instead of founding the town Viceroy Luis de Velazco merely gave it the name: Santa Maria del Rio.  The Franciscan Convent was built in 1604.  The settled inhabitants were Guachichil and Otomi, with the lands being divided between them by a road and the church.

Cinnabar mining started with the general opening of mines in the province; however their mining techniques were labor-intensive, and the mines were subject to frequent flooding.

The bridge over the Santa Maria river was begun in 1844, but it was not completed until the French intervention in Mexico.  By the year 1853, the town of Santa Maria del Rio had twenty thousand inhabitants. In 1866  telegraph service was instituted, mostly through the efforts of General Tomás Mejía.  In May 1914, the town of  Santa Maria del Rio was the site for fierce fighting between the 150 occupying huertistas and the Constitutionalists. The 400 Constitutionalists captured the town.  Electrification of the municipality began in 1927, under the direction of Governor Dr Abel Cano.

Sites of interest

Government 
The current president of the municipality is Israel Reyna Rosas, of the Institutional Revolutionary Party (PRI). The town Santa María del Río is the administrative seat.  The municipality has 302 other settlements, among which are:

External links 
 "Estado de San Luis Potosí - Santa María del Río" Enciclopedia de los Municipios de México Instituto Nacional para el Federalismo y el Desarrollo Municipal, Secretaría de Gobernación (2005) , in Spanish, accessed 29 December 2008
 Map of Villa de Reyes and Santa Maria del Río Maps of Mexico, accessed 29 December 2008

Notes

Municipalities of San Luis Potosí